Turtle Bay Exploration Park, located in Redding, California, is a non-profit 300-acre gathering place featuring the Sundial Bridge, a museum, forestry and wildlife center, arboretum and botanical gardens. The park is located at gateway to the Sacramento River Trails, Turtle Bay.

McConnell Arboretum & Botanical Gardens

Its principal gardens include the Mediterranean Climate Gardens (Mediterranean Basin, South Africa, Chile, southern and western Australia, and California west of the Sierra Nevada), and other gardens including a children's garden, butterfly garden, and specialty gardens.

Turtle Bay Museum

Turtle Bay Museum contains permanent and changing exhibits related to the area's natural history, cultural history, art and science. Exhibits include a tank for viewing fish underwater, a recreation of a Native American bark house, hands-on science displays and art creations.

Paul Bunyan's Forest Camp
Paul Bunyan's Forest Camp is an education exploration center modeled after an old-time forest camp. The Mill Building houses displays of North State forests and local wildlife, including live animals. Outdoor exhibits focus on the timber and logging industries in California and the railroads. Other amenities include outdoor play equipment, a water feature, an amphitheater that hosts seasonal animal show, and a seasonal aviary and butterfly house.

See also 

 List of botanical gardens in the United States
 Sequoia Park Zoo

External links 
 Official Website

Museums in Shasta County, California
Natural history museums in California
Parks in Shasta County, California
Forestry museums in the United States
History museums in California
Nature centers in California
Art museums and galleries in California
Science museums in California
Buildings and structures in Redding, California